

International 
He was 2002 nominated in the 36 man squad for the Fifa World Cup 2002, his first game for the Nigeria national football team was on 20 June 2004 Vs. Angola.

References

External links

1984 births
Living people
Nigerian footballers
Nigeria international footballers
Nigerian expatriate footballers
K.A.A. Gent players
FC Progresul București players
Expatriate footballers in Romania
Liga I players
Paris Saint-Germain F.C. players
R.A.E.C. Mons players
Nigerian expatriate sportspeople in Romania
Kano Pillars F.C. players
Sunshine Stars F.C. players
Wikki Tourists F.C. players
Association football wingers